Castelfusano is an urban park in the comune of Rome. It divides the sea quarter of Ostia and the neighborhood of Casalpalocco. The castle and the park were founded in the 17th century by the Sacchetti family. Its vegetation consists mainly in a forest of colossal Maritime Pines and olm oaks (near the seaside). In the 18th century, the Sacchetti sold the property to the Chigi, who sold it in 1933 to the commune of Rome. In the park is still visible a stretch of the ancient Via Severiana. The park's vegetation was largely destroyed by arson in July 2000.

References

Gardens in Rome
Rome Q. XXXV Lido di Castel Fusano